Anton Hur (born April 7, 1981) is a writer and translator of Korean literature. He has translated the works of Kyung-Sook Shin, Hwang Sok-yong, and Sang Young Park, whose Love in the Big City was longlisted for the 2022 International Booker Prize, and Bora Chung, whose collection of short stories Cursed Bunny was shortlisted for the same prize. Hur was also the only translator that year to have been longlisted for two translations. Hur was awarded a PEN/Heim Translation Fund Grants for his translation of Cursed Bunny. Hur was awarded a PEN Translates grant to translate The Underground Village by Kang Kyeong-ae.

Biography 
Hur, a Korean citizen, was born in Stockholm on April 7, 1981. His father worked for KOTRA, a state-funded trade and investment promotion organization of the South Korean government, and he was raised in various countries including Hong Kong, Ethiopia, and Thailand before settling in Korea. As his family did not initially support him studying literature, he studied law and psychology at Korea University and French at Korea National Open University before pursuing a master's degree in English literature at Seoul National University. He began working as a translator full-time in 2018, beginning with Kyung-Sook Shin's The Court Dancer. He manages the literary translation group Smoking Tigers. 

In addition to translating Korean literature into English, Hur is also the translator of the forthcoming Korean edition of Ocean Vuong's Night Sky with Exit Wounds. His writing has been published in outlets such as Astra Magazine, Words Without Borders, Lithub, Asymptote, and many others. In 2022, he was a recipient of the 13th Yumin Award, an award created in honour of the founder of the newspaper JoongAng Ilbo, that honours "Koreans who made crucial contributions to society, science and technology, as well as culture and arts".  

Hur is openly queer and has written about sexuality, the history of diverse sexuality in Korean literature beginning with Yi Kwang-su's 1909 short story Is It Love, and misery as an enduring theme in queer Korean literature. He and his husband divide their time between Seoul and Songdo in Incheon. Hur uses he/they pronouns.

Selected translations

References 

Living people
1981 births

Korean–English translators

Literary translators
Seoul National University alumni
21st-century translators